The Providence Church in Nicholasville, Kentucky, later home of Kindred's Antiques, is a historic church building. It was built in 1849 and added to the National Register in 1984.

It is a brick church with brick pilasters and with doors framed in elaborately carved stone.  It has Greek Revival and Gothic Revival elements.

References

Churches on the National Register of Historic Places in Kentucky
Gothic Revival church buildings in Kentucky
Churches completed in 1849
19th-century churches in the United States
Churches in Jessamine County, Kentucky
1849 establishments in Kentucky
National Register of Historic Places in Jessamine County, Kentucky
Greek Revival architecture in Kentucky
Nicholasville, Kentucky